This is a timeline of the Northern and Southern dynasties in China.

380s

390s

400s

410s

420s

430s

440s

450s

460s

470s

480s

490s

500s

510s

520s

530s

540s

550s

560s

570s

580s

Gallery

References

Bibliography

 

Timelines of Chinese eras and periods